The US1, sometimes written US 1, is an American sailing dinghy that was designed by Ralph Kuppersmith and Clark Mills as a one-design racer and first built in 1973.

The design is most likely a catboat-rigged derivation of the Mills-designed Windmill of 1953.

Production
The design was initially built by Kuppersmith's company, the Advance Sailboat Corporation of Parkville, Missouri and later of Independence, Missouri, United States. That company went out of business in 1980 and the boat design was then built by Continental Sailcraft. A total of 450 boats were completed, but it is now out of production.

Design
The US1 is a recreational sailboat, built predominantly of fiberglass. It has a catboat rig with a loose-footed mainsail and foam-filled aluminum spars to reduce the risk of turtling. The hull features a rounded foredeck, a plumb stem, a vertical transom, a transom-hung, kick-up rudder controlled by a tiller and a retractable centerboard. It displaces .

For sailing the design is equipped with a dual Cunningham and an outhaul.

The class rules allow specific modifications to the boat, including the installation of two bailers, centerboard gaskets, four inspection ports, changes to the sheeting, the boom vang, the Cunningham, mainsheet traveler, outhaul, as well as the rudder and tiller and the centerboard control lines.

At one time the class rules allowed the use of a three-piece mast as an alternative to the standard two-piece mast, but this change was repealed.

The design has a Portsmouth Yardstick racing average handicap of 91.5 and is normally raced with a crew of one or two sailors, who are limited by the class rules to  total weight.

Operational history
In 1994 there were active fleets racing in Missouri, Ohio, Pennsylvania and Texas.

See also
List of sailing boat types

References

Dinghies
1970s sailboat type designs
Sailboat type designs by Ralph Kuppersmith
Sailboat type designs by Clark Mills
Sailboat types built by Advance Sailboat Corporation
Sailboat types built by Continental Sailcraft